Club Social y Atlético Guillermo Brown, mostly known as Guillermo Brown or Brown de Puerto Madryn, is an Argentine sports club from Puerto Madryn in Chubut Province. The football team currently plays in the Primera B Nacional.

History
The club was named in honour of Guillermo Brown who was the Irish-born first admiral of Argentina in the mid 19th Century.

Brown finished at the top of their group in the 2006 Clausura for the Torneo Argentino A, but failed in the next stage, after being defeated by San Martín de Tucumán in the playoff series with scores of 0–3 and 2–2.

On May 19, 2012, Brown achieved its greatest professional achievement in football, managing a 2–2 draw at Estadio Monumental with a last minute goal from  against a River Plate squad with notable players such as David Trezeguet, Fernando Cavenaghi, Lucas Ocampos, and Alejandro Dominguez.

Current squad

Out on loan

Titles
Torneo Argentino A: 2
 Clausura 2007, 2010–11

Torneo Argentino B: 1
 2002–03

Liga del Valle: 13
 Regional 1947, Oficial 1954, Preparación 1962, Preparación 1963, Preparación 1967, Oficial 1967,
 Apertura 1996, Clausura 1999, Clausura 2000, Apertura 2001, Clausura 2002, Apertura 2005, Apertura 2013

References

External links

Brown 2000 website

 
B
B
B